The 1956 Glover Trophy was a non-championship Formula One race, held on 2 April 1956 at Goodwood Circuit, England. The race was won by Stirling Moss after a set distance of 32 laps.

Entry list

Classification

Qualifying

Race

References

Glover Trophy
Glover Trophy
20th century in West Sussex
Glover
Glover Trophy